Michel Godard is a French avant-garde jazz and classical musician. He plays tuba and the predecessor of the tuba, a brass instrument known as the serpent.

Career
At 18, Godard was a member of the Philharmonic Orchestra of Radio-France. He has also been member of the French National Jazz Orchestra and the Arban Chamber Brass quintet, and has played with the Ensemble Musique Vivante,  the ancient music Ensemble La Venice and "XVIII-21Musique de Lumieres".

Godard has participated in projects with Michel Portal, Louis Sclavis, Enrico Rava, Michael Riessler, Horace Tapscott, Christof Lauer, Kenny Wheeler, Ray Anderson, Rabih Abou-Khalil, Sylvie Courvoisier, Simon Nabatov, Samo Salamon, Linda Sharrock, Pierre Favre, Misha Mengelberg, Gianluigi Trovesi, Willem Breuker, Gabriele Mirabassi, the ARTE Quartett and more recently in a quartet with co-tubist Dave Bargeron.

His album Three Seasons (HGBS, 2014) with Günter "Baby" Sommer and Patrick Bebelaar) was awarded Album of the Year 2014 by The New York City Jazz Record. The album Stupor Mundi (DML, 2015) with Patrick Bebelaar, Vincent Klink, Gavino Murgia and Carlo Rizzo was awarded the German Record Critics' Award.

Godard has also played and recorded with the pipeband of the Brittany town Quimper, with reggae star Alpha Blondy, and with Canterbury rock musicians John Greaves and Pip Pyle.

As a composer, he has been commissioned by Radio France, Donaueschingen Music Festival, and the French Ministry of Cultural Affairs.

Discography
 You Never Lose an Island (dml, 2002) with Patrick Bebelaar, Herbert Joos, Frank Kroll
 Point of View (dml, 2003) with Frank Kroll, Patrick Bebelaar, Prakash Maharaj, Subhash Maharaj, Vikash Maharaj
 Cousins Germains (CAM Jazz, 2005) with Christof Lauer, Wolfgang Pusching, Herbert Joos, Frank Tortiller, Wolfgang Reisinger
 Pantheon (dml, 2007) with Fried Dähn, Patrick Bebelaar, Herbert Joos, Frank Kroll, Carlo Rizzo
 Three Seasons (HGBS, 2014) with Günter Sommer and Patrick Bebelaar
 Stupor Mundi (dml, 2014) with Patrick Bebelaar, Gavino Murgia, Carlo Rizzo and Vincent Klink
 Awakening (Buda Musique, 2019) with Alim Qasimov

With CMC Ensemble
 Contra Puncta (Losen, 2018)

With Rabih Abou-Khalil
The Sultan's Picnic (Enja, 1994)
Arabian Waltz (Enja, 1996)
Odd Times (Enja, 1997)
The Cactus of Knowledge (Enja, 2001)
Morton's Foot (Enja, 2003)
Songs for Sad Women (Enja, 2007)
Em Português (Enja, 2008)
Trouble in Jerusalem (Enja, 2010)
With Pierre Favre
 Fleuve (ECM, 2005)
With Samo Salamon
 Nano (Goga, 2006)
 Fall Memories (Splasc(h) Records, 2007)
 Live! (Samo Records, 2009)
 Eleven Stories (Samo Records, 2012)

References

Year of birth missing (living people)
Living people
French jazz tubists
21st-century tubists
Orchestre National de Jazz members
Intakt Records artists